Leslie Parrish (born Marjorie Hellen; March 13, 1935) is an American actress, activist, environmentalist, writer, and producer.  She worked under her birth name for six years, changing it in 1959.

Early life
As a child, Parrish lived in Massachusetts, Pennsylvania, New York, and New Jersey. At the age of 10, she finally settled in Upper Black Eddy, Pennsylvania. At the age of 14, Parrish was a talented and promising piano and composition student at the Philadelphia Conservatory of Music. At the age of 16, Parrish earned money for her tuition by working as a maid and a waitress, and by teaching piano. At the age of 18, to earn enough money to be able to continue her education at the Conservatory, her mother persuaded her to become a model for one year.

Modeling and acting
In April 1954, as a 19-year-old model with the Conover Agency in New York City, Parrish was under contract to NBC-TV as "Miss Color TV" (she was used during broadcasts as a human test pattern to check accuracy of skin tones). She was quickly discovered and signed with Twentieth Century Fox in Hollywood. In 1956, she was put under contract to Metro-Goldwyn-Mayer. Because acting allowed her to help her family financially, she remained in Hollywood and gave up her career in music.

Films and television

Parrish co-starred/guest-starred in numerous films and television shows throughout the 1960s and 1970s.  She first gained wide attention in her first starring role as Daisy Mae in the movie version of Li'l Abner (1959), where she changed her name from Marjorie Hellen to Leslie Parrish at the director's request. She appeared in the film The Manchurian Candidate (1962), playing Laurence Harvey's on-screen fiancée, Jocelyn Jordan.  Other film credits include starring opposite Kirk Douglas in For Love or Money (1963) and Jerry Lewis in Three on a Couch (1966), among others.

Parrish amassed an extensive résumé of television credits. Among many other credits, Parrish appeared in guest starring roles on episodes of The Wild Wild West, My Three Sons, Perry Mason, Family Affair, Bat Masterson, The Man From U.N.C.L.E., Adam-12, Good Morning World, Police Story, Batman and McCloud. In 1967, she guest-starred on Star Trek in the season two episode entitled "Who Mourns For Adonais?" She portrayed Lt. Carolyn Palamas, the love interest of the character Apollo, played by Michael Forest. In February 1968, she played opposite Peter Breck in an episode of The Big Valley entitled "A Bounty on a Barkley". The following month, Parrish made her first guest appearance on Mannix in the episode "The Girl in the Frame".

Parrish was associate producer on the film version of Jonathan Livingston Seagull (1973). Among other things, she hired the director of photography Jack Couffer—who later received an Academy Award nomination for his efforts—and she was responsible for the care of the film's real-life seagulls, which she kept inside a room at a Holiday Inn for the duration of the shoot. When the relationship between author Richard Bach and director Hall Bartlett disintegrated and a lawsuit followed, Parrish was appointed as the mediator between the two men. However, her final credit was demoted from associate producer to "researcher".
In 1975, Parrish appeared in the low budget B-Movie The Giant Spider Invasion which is now regarded as a cult film.

While acting provided financial stability, her main interest was in social causes including the anti-war and civil rights movements and, as far back as the mid 1950s, the environment.

Political activism
Parrish's interests and activities in social movements and politics grew to become her main work. She was a vocal opponent of the Vietnam War, a member of the Jeannette Rankin Brigade, a group of notable women who fought against the war and for civil rights. In 1967, she participated in a peace march in Century City (near Beverly Hills) where she and thousands of other protestors were attacked and beaten by police and the National Guard. President Lyndon Johnson was present at the Century Plaza Hotel and helicopters were flying overhead with machine guns pointed at the marchers.

Parrish started to make speeches in the Los Angeles area, telling residents what the media did not report and speaking out against the war. Impressed with her speaking abilities, several professors from UCLA aligned with the anti-war movement asked her to organize more like-minded actors and actresses who would be willing to speak out. Two weeks later Parrish had created "STOP!" (Speakers and Talent Organized for Peace), an organization of two dozen members ready to engage the public. Shortly thereafter, the organization grew to 125 speakers, and many more subsequently.

On August 6, 1967, Parrish helped organize a protest march of 17,000 people on the "Miracle Mile" of Wilshire Boulevard in Los Angeles, which received extensive media coverage and national attention. She also created a popular bumper sticker: 'Suppose they gave a war and no one came'. Parrish and her friends distributed hundreds of them from their vehicles. Walter Cronkite reported that Bobby Kennedy had one in his plane. Someone later published the bumper sticker, changing the original wording to 'WHAT IF they gave a war and no one came' but to Parrish, the important thing was spreading that message.

In October 1967, a private meeting was arranged between Parrish and Bobby Kennedy by mutual friend and well-known Kennedy photographer, Stanley Tretick. She begged Kennedy to run for president, telling him that huge, influential organizations opposed to the war in Vietnam were ready to support him were he to run. Kennedy refused again and again, saying he could not oppose Lyndon Johnson, a sitting president. On November 30, Eugene McCarthy, a little-known senator, declared he would run against the war and challenge Johnson. Parrish was elected chair of his speaker's bureau and utilized STOP! to develop support for McCarthy. On March 12, 1968, McCarthy almost defeated Johnson in the New Hampshire primary winning 42% of the vote. On March 16 (four days later) Bobby Kennedy announced that he would run for president. Two weeks later, on March 31, Johnson declared that he would not run for re-election. Parrish remained loyal to McCarthy and was elected a delegate to represent him in August at the 1968 Democratic National Convention in Chicago.

On April 4, 1968, Parrish and Leonard Nimoy (who was a STOP! member and supporter of Eugene McCarthy) flew to San Francisco to open McCarthy's new headquarters there. After they left, they learned of the assassination of Martin Luther King Jr. Nimoy and Parrish cried during the speeches they gave that evening.

In August, during the Chicago Democratic Convention, McCarthy delegates, including Parrish, spent little time on the convention floor. The real work on the night of the nomination, August 28, was outside the Hilton Hotel where violent actions by police against anti-war demonstrators and spectators were being covered by live television  and thousands of people chanted "The whole world is watching".

Hubert Humphrey was nominated by the convention but lost the election to Richard Nixon. While still in Chicago, the peace movement began working toward the 1972 election, hoping to elect George McGovern. McGovern did win primaries and Parrish served as a delegate at the 1972 Democratic Convention in Miami, Florida. But McGovern lost to Richard Nixon.

During this era of political activism, Parrish worked in numerous political campaigns (presidential, gubernatorial, senatorial, congressional, mayoral) and with many different organizations, producing public events and fund-raisers for them. Her last major production was the National Mobilization Committee to End the War in Vietnam (MOBE) held November 16, 1969 at San Francisco's Polo Grounds.

Los Angeles municipal government
In 1969, Parrish joined many in an effort to remove Los Angeles mayor Sam Yorty from office. She supported and campaigned for a former police lieutenant named Tom Bradley who was then the city's first black city councilman. Despite high polling numbers prior to the election, Bradley lost to Yorty, giving rise to what was later known as "The Bradley Effect." Next day, he decided to run again, and over the next four years Parrish worked with him closely to help secure his victory in the next mayoral election. In 1973, Tom Bradley became Los Angeles's first black mayor. Parrish was one of forty activist citizens who served on Bradley's Blue Ribbon Commission to choose new Los Angeles Commissioners. Over the next 20 years, Tom Bradley brought massive development to the city and was reelected five times, setting a record for length of tenure. Parrish and Tom Bradley remained friends for many years.

Creator of innovative television
The lack of media coverage during the Century City riots in 1967 prompted Parrish to think of a new way to cover such events live to prevent suppression and/or manipulation of the news. In 1969, she began to create a television station that would devote itself to covering public events and provide in-depth analysis and discussions of important developments in the world. In 1974, KVST-TV (Viewer Sponsored Television, Channel 68, Los Angeles) went on the air as part of the PBS system of stations. Film notables, business people and local activists formed the board of directors and provided support for the unique station. After a difficult start, KVST was receiving positive reviews in Los Angeles and nationwide attention. However, by 1976, internal dissension on the board of directors led to the demise of the station. The signal was turned off and KVST-TV was never heard from again.

Environmental activism
Parrish's concern for the environment dates back to the 1950s when Los Angeles’ severe smog, and the reason for it, worried her. In 1979, she and her then-husband, Richard Bach, built an experimental home in southwest Oregon using 100% solar power with no cooling or heating systems, in order to prove it could be done.

While living in Oregon, Parrish saw devastated forests managed by the Bureau of Land Management (BLM) and decided to protest a local timber sale. With two neighbors, she and Richard established an organization called "Threatened and Endangered: Little Applegate Valley" (TELAV). They worked for two years researching and writing a 600-page legal and scientific protest of BLM's logging of forests which would not regenerate, which was illegal. The BLM assistant state director eventually agreed, telling the Medford Mail Tribune that ..."The sale involves enough improprieties in BLM rules and procedures that it can’t be legally awarded. In order to comply with our own procedures we had no choice but to withdraw the sale and reject all bids." The TELAV protest document served as the basis for many future timber sale protests in the U.S. and Canada.  TELAV continues to fight for the environment to this day and the Little Applegate Valley has never been logged.

In 1999, Parrish created a 240-acre (97 ha) wildlife sanctuary on Orcas Island (in the San Juan Islands, Washington State) to save it from normal development techniques which include logging. She named it the "Spring Hill Wildlife Sanctuary". For seventeen years, she carefully developed the ridge-top property by creating nearly a dozen small, hidden home sites on 25% of the land while preserving the remainder in perpetuity within the San Juan Preservation Trust. While the property is now fully developed there are no breaks in the heavily forested ridge line. The developed land is invisible from the island community and the forest is intact.

Marriages
Parrish married songwriter Ric Marlow in 1955; the couple divorced in 1961. In 1981, she married Richard Bach, the author of the 1970 book Jonathan Livingston Seagull, whom she met during the making of the 1973 movie of the same name. She was a major element in two of his subsequent books—The Bridge Across Forever (1984) and One (1988)—which primarily focused on their relationship and Bach's concept of soulmates. They divorced in 1999.

Film credits

* credited as Marjorie Hellen

Television credits

General television credits

Variety show credits (live TV)

In-depth interview program

Talk shows

Game shows

References

Sources
The International Leslie Parrish Website - The Official Site / Full Biography page

External links

 Leslie Parrish(Aveleyman)

1935 births
Actresses from Pennsylvania
American film actresses
American television actresses
Living people
People from Bucks County, Pennsylvania
People from Melrose, Massachusetts
University of the Arts (Philadelphia) alumni
20th-century American actresses
21st-century American women